Mission High School is a public high school in the San Francisco Unified School District (SFUSD) San Francisco, California.

Serving grades 9-12, Mission is the oldest high school on its original site in San Francisco; it has been on 18th Street, between Dolores and Church, since 1896. The original campus burned in 1922, and the replacement was completed in two stages, the west wing in 1925 and the main building was dedicated by San Francisco mayor James Rolph on June 12, 1927. Originally, girls and boys had separate courtyards. Mission Creek runs beneath the school.

The school is two blocks from Mission Dolores, from which it gets its name. The current student body is diverse, with Latino and Asian students constituting the two largest ethnic groups, although neither group makes up a majority of the student body.

The lobby leads to a theater that has 1,750 folding wooden seats on two levels and a gold-leaf ceiling. Grand as any movie palace, it was outfitted with twin 35 mm projectors. Funding failed to materialize for the elaborate pipe organ system as promised, but the chandeliers have been re-lamped.

History

Mission High School was founded in 1890, although it was housed in various Mission District locations until 1896. That year, the Board of Education purchased a parcel of land from the Jewish Cemetery Association to construct a permanent school building. The original Mission High School building was completed in 1898 as a three-story brick school designed in the Italian Renaissance Beaux-Arts style. The building withstood the 1906 earthquake, and became a neighborhood shelter, while Dolores Park, which stands across the street from the school, became a tent city for displaced residents.

In 1922, the original Mission High School was destroyed by fire. The present Mission High School complex was then constructed in a California Churrigueresque style between 1925 and 1927, during the height of San Francisco's "Golden Age" of school construction. John W. Reid, Jr., San Francisco's City Architect, was the designer. The elaborate ornamentation on the school is likely due in part to the visual proximity to the nearby Mission Dolores Basilica, which features towers and ornamentation in the Churrigueresque architectural style.

In 1936, California artist Edith Anne Hamlin was commissioned under the Works Progress Administration's Federal Art Project to create a series of western-themed murals for the school. Noted artist Maynard Dixon consulted with Hamlin on the murals, and the pair married in 1937. Two murals showing the founding of nearby Mission Dolores still survive, while the third was lost during a 1970s seismic retrofit. The late 1930s also saw the construction of Drew Athletic Field behind the school, in an area that had been occupied by houses fronting on Dorland Street (that one block of Dorland was removed to construct the field).

Mission High School was retrofitted to meet earthquake safety standards starting in 1972. This included the removal of some of the building's architectural ornamentation, as well as the loss of the WPA Hamlin mural. Students attended Polytechnic High School until their return in 1978. The building continues to function as a public high school and remains an architectural landmark in the Dolores Park area of San Francisco.

In the 2007–08 school year, principal Kevin Truitt won SFUSD Principal of the Year and in 2014 principal Eric Guthertz won the same award.

Statistics

Demographics 

According to U.S. News & World Report, 91% of Mission's student body is "of color," with 77% of the student body coming from an economically disadvantaged household, determined by student eligibility for California's Reduced-price meal program.

Standardized Testing

Diversity
Mission High school is the first public school to hold an LGBTQ/Drag Show Assembly.

Programs

Mission is the Academic Scholars Advancement Program (ASAP) is a summer program that sends 150 Mission High School athletes attended 31 programs. They traveled to 22 locations in nine states, and a few ventured as far as Japan, China, and Italy. ASAP helps cover the bill to send these kids to a summer program.

Notable alumni and faculty members from Mission High School 

Charles Phan, chef, cookbook author, and restaurateur 
Tyler Gilbert, an American professional baseball pitcher for the Arizona Diamondbacks of Major League Baseball. He made his major league debut on August 3,
Nancy Pelosi,  an American politician serving as speaker of the United States House of Representatives since 2019, 
Nick Allen (infielder), Oakland As MLB player (shortstop), born in San Diego
Bruce Lee, martial arts instructor, actor, filmmaker, and philosopher.
Marshawn Lynch, grew up in Oakland until Senior Year, an American former football running back who played in the National Football League for 12 seasons. 
Wally Berger, class of 1923 — professional baseball player, starting center fielder in the first All-Star Game
Dorothy Bryant — teacher, novelist, and playwright
Jeffrey Cariaso, class of 1990 — former professional basketball coach and player, Philippine Basketball Association.
Joe Cronin, class of 1923— professional baseball player and Hall of Famer
Babe Dahlgren, class of 1932 — professional baseball player
Vincent DeDomenico, class of 1933 — inventor of Rice-A-Roni and developer of the Napa Valley Wine Train
Bobby Freeman — rock and roll and R&B singer from the late 1950s; "Do You Want to Dance"
Alan Gallagher, 1963 — former San Francisco Giants third baseman
Eddie Joost, class of 1934 — professional baseball player
Walt Judnich, class of 1934 — professional baseball player
Lloyd Leith — Basketball Hall of Fame coach and referee
Guy Mitchell — 1950s pop singer
Melissa Ng, 1990 — Hong Kong TV actress
Lothar Osiander — professional soccer coach (MLS, US National Soccer Team)
James Rolph — governor of California (1931–1934) and mayor of San Francisco (1912–1931)
Carlos Santana — musician and songwriter
Jorge Santana — Musician, Malo (band)
Gus Triandos, 1948 — professional baseball player
Leland Yee — California State Senator

Faculty 

 Robert Roth — Social Studies teacher

See also

San Francisco County high schools
List of San Francisco Designated Landmarks

References

External links

- official website
Mission High School - SFUSD website
Great Schools profile
California Department of Education - DataQuest reports
Mission High Foundation

Mission District, San Francisco
Public high schools in San Francisco
Educational institutions established in 1890
1890 establishments in California
San Francisco Designated Landmarks
Spanish Revival architecture in California
San Francisco Unified School District schools